Orthogonius mellyi is a species of ground beetle in the subfamily Orthogoniinae. It was described by Maximilien Chaudoir in 1850 and named after the collector Andre Melly.

References

mellyi
Beetles described in 1850